The Type 98 (PF-98) is a 120mm unguided anti-tank rocket system developed by Norinco for the People's Liberation Army as a successor to the Type 65 and Type 78 recoilless guns. It is also known by its nickname, "Queen Bee". It can be equipped with a firing control system which predicts the future aiming point based on calculations before the rocket fire.

Development
The PLA began to search for a successor for the Type 78 in the 1990s. The older, 1950s-era equipment began to show its age. The Type 98 was revealed with a garrison unit in Macao in 1999, while some elite units began to receive the weapon after 2000.

The design makes the accurate delivery of a 120 mm multi-purpose high-explosive or high-explosive anti-tank projectile with negligible recoil possible. The weapon can be tripod- or shoulder-fired.

Design

Launcher
PF-98 reusable tube launcher is a fibreglass-wrapped smoothbore gun and weighs under . Two variants, battalion-level and company-level, are available. Both variants share the same launch tube and rocket projectiles. Their difference in capabilities and usage lies in their sighting system and tripod mount. Both PF-98 variants are fitted with a proprietary rail mount that can be equipped with a fire control system, daylight optics, or night vision scope. The Battalion version features a fire control system, medium-range night vision scope, and large tripod. The tripod of the battalion version allows an elevation of +30° to −6°, and a horizontal traverse of 360°. The company version has daylight optics, close-range night vision scope, and a small fixed tripod to support the launcher in the prone position. The weapon can be operated by one soldier or a crew of two. The accessories can be mounted interchangeably.

The PF-98A is the improved variant of PF-98, which was incorporated into service in 2006. The PF-98A launcher's firing tube, tripod and carrying handle are modified to reduce weight. The new launcher weighs . It's also fitted with improved night-vision scope and fire control systems. The PF-98A launcher can be distinguished from its predecessor by its octagon-shaped forward and rear shock absorbers, which prevent the launcher from rolling on uneven surfaces.

The PLA deployed PF-98 to both Company and Battalion firepower units for direct infantry fire support, with iterative improvements such as new fire-control systems, lighter launcher tubes, and programmable munitions. Since the deployment of more sophisticated missiles at battalion/company-level firepower units, PF-98 launchers have been transferred to infantry squads of lower echelons. In late 2018, the lightweight PF-98A was deployed for infantry use on a squad level.

Sights
Three types of sight systems are available for PF-98 series: fire control systems, daylight (4x) telescopic sights, and night-vision scopes. PF-98 battalion version is fitted with the fire control system and night-vision scope, while the company version is fitted with the daylight telescopic sight and night-vision scope. An integrated fire control/night vision system is available for the PF-98A variants.

Fire control systems
The fire-control of the battalion version Type 98 consists of a Y/MK/PF-98(Y)-120 (4x) optical sight, which includes a fire-control computer, a laser rangefinder, an outside display, an LED display inside the optical sight, and a keyboard with 25 buttons. After pressing the range-finding button on the extension cord, the system will automatically irradiate the target and make ballistic calculations. The operator can input additional information such as target speed, direction, crosswind, temperature and altitude using the keyboard. After calculating the lead of the moving target, the computer will put a light spot in the gunner’s optical sight. The soldier then uses the light spot as the crosshair to guarantee a hit. This mechanism reduces the reaction time and makes for increased accuracy. This fire control system went through two upgrades, Type 00 and Type 01. Type 00 features revised aiming reticles. Type 01 fire control system featured a smaller fire control unit with a new ballistic computer, a new rangefinder unit, and a revised keyboard layout with 12 buttons.

Type 98A fire control system features a new laser rangefinder, speed calculation unit, and ballistic computer. The Type 98A FCS will automatically track the target and calculate the aiming assist light spot based on the range, target speed, selected ammo type, temperature and altitude. In late 2018, a new integrated fire control system is observed in PLAGF military exercises. The new fire control system is fitted with a night-vision scope on the top, and the keyboard is moved to the left side. New FCS is capable of airburst programming.

Optical sights
The company version Type 98 is fitted with an Y/MK/PF-98(L)-120 (4x) telescopic optical sight. Inside the scope, a light spot at the top will flash every second/half a second to assist the shooter's leading calculation. The company level's optical sight has the same ranging marks and reticles as the one on the PF-89.

Both company and battalion version PF-98 have dedicated night vision scope, with the battalion version having a longer range. For PF-98A, company and battalion version no longer has different night-vision scope. The battery duration for night-vision is improved from 7 hours on PF-98, to 40 hours on PF-98A. The weight of the scope is also reduced from 2.85 kg to 1.2 kg.

Projectiles
Type 98 High Explosive Anti Tank (HEAT) projectile, military designation DZP-98, is armed with a tandem-warhead and an electronically timed fuse. The round can pierce the reactive armor of a main battle tank, and has an armor-piercing depth of about 800 mm RHA (under 90 degrees, after ERA) at a maximum effective range of 800 m. The maximum flying range is 2000 m. The HEAT rounds weights . The case for booster charge is fitted with a small drogue parachute to reduce its fly out distance for improved safety inside backblast area.

Type 98 Multipurpose High Explosive Incendiary (HEI) projectile, military designation DZY-98, has a warhead with 2000 steel balls and zirconium incendiary material. This projectile is capable of piercing 400 mm armor and spread fragments inside the vehicle, or producing fragments to kill other personnel within 25 m of the point of impact. The maximum range is 1,800–2,000 m with fire control system or 800 m with daylight optics. Other technical parameters are kept the same.

Type 98 Thermobaric (FAE) projectile, military designation DZT-98, is armed with a thermobaric warhead capable of eliminating targets within a 90m³ room. The maximum range is 1,800–2,000 m with fire control system or 800 m with daylight optics. Type 98 FAE projectiles are kept the same in Type 98A upgrade.

Type 98A Bunker Buster, military designation DZD-98A, is developed and deployed with Type 98A rocket launcher. The maximum range is 1,800–2,000 m with fire control system or 800 m with daylight optics.

Variants
PF98 Battalion and company level version.
PF98A Lightweight version with improved fire control system, night-vision scope, and tripod.

Users

Bangladesh Army

Cameroon Armed Forces

People's Liberation Army Ground Force

See also
 PF-89
 Carl Gustav recoilless rifle (MAAWS) - Swedish–American recoilless rifle
 Shoulder-launched Multipurpose Assault Weapon (SMAW) - American rocket launcher
 Panzerfaust 3 (Pzf-3) - German rocket launcher
 RPG-29 - Soviet reusable rocket-propelled grenade (RPG) launcher

References

External links
 PF-98 at SinoDefence

Weapons of the People's Republic of China
Anti-tank rockets
Military equipment introduced in the 1990s
Norinco